Lot and His Daughters is a c. 1621–1624 painting of Lot and his daughters by Orazio Gentileschi, now in the National Gallery of Canada, in Ottawa.

References

Paintings of Lot (biblical person)
Paintings by Orazio Gentileschi
1624 paintings